My Friend Pierrette is a Canadian comedy-drama film, directed by Jean Pierre Lefebvre and released in 1969. The film stars Yves Marchand and Francine Mathieu as Yves and Pierrette, a young couple who are spending their first vacation together at a family cottage when they meet Raoul (Raôul Duguay), an artist who comes between them.

The film opened theatrically in Quebec in July 1969, and was later screened in the Directors Fortnight program at the 1970 Cannes Film Festival.

The film was included in Jean Pierre Lefebvre: Vidéaste, a retrospective program of Lefebvre's films at the 2001 Toronto International Film Festival.

References

External links

1969 films
Canadian drama films
1969 drama films
Films directed by Jean Pierre Lefebvre
Films shot in Quebec
French-language Canadian films
1960s Canadian films